Nole   is a comune (municipality) in the Metropolitan City of Turin in the Italian region Piedmont, located about  northwest of Turin in the lower Canavese, at the foot of the Valli di Lanzo.

Nole borders the municipalities of Corio, Rocca Canavese, Grosso, San Carlo Canavese, Villanova Canavese, Cirié, Fiano, and Robassomero.

Twin towns
 Charvieu-Chavagneux, France (1987)

References

Cities and towns in Piedmont
Canavese